4th Earl of Clarendon may refer to:

Henry Hyde, 4th Earl of Clarendon of the 1661 creation, (lived 1672–1753)
George William Frederick Villiers, 4th Earl of Clarendon of the 1776 creation (lived 1800–1870)